Toukouzou is a coastal town in southern Ivory Coast. It is a sub-prefecture of Grand-Lahou Department in Grands-Ponts Region, Lagunes District.

Toukouzou was a commune until March 2012, when it became one of 1126 communes nationwide that were abolished.

In 2014, the population of the sub-prefecture of Toukouzou was 2,562.

Villages
The 4 villages of the sub-prefecture of Toukouzou and their population in 2014 are:
 Amessan N'guessandon (301)
 Djateket (335)
 Noumouzou (430)
 Toukouzou (1 496)

References

Sub-prefectures of Grands-Ponts
Former communes of Ivory Coast